This is a survey of the postage stamps and postal history of Slovakia.

Slovakia borders the Czech Republic and Austria to the west, Poland to the north, Ukraine to the east and Hungary to the south. The largest city is its capital, Bratislava.

Austria-Hungary 

Before 1918, the territory of modern Slovakia was part of the Kingdom of Hungary within the Austro-Hungarian Empire. Stamps of the Kingdom of Hungary were in use.

Czechoslovak Republic 
After World War I and the dissolution of the Austro-Hungarian Empire, Slovakia and the regions of Bohemia, Moravia, and Carpathian Ruthenia formed the Czechoslovak Republic. From 1918 to 1939, stamps of the Czechoslovak Republic inscribed either Česko-Slovensko or Československo were used in Slovakia.

World War II 
Between 1939 and 1945, the Slovak Republic, a client state of Nazi Germany, issued stamps inscribed Slovensko.

Post war 
After World War II, Slovakia was again part of the re-established Czechoslovakia from 1945 to 1992. Czechoslovakian stamps inscribed Československo were used during that time.

The Slovak Republic
From 1 January 1993, Slovakia became independent after splitting from the Czech Republic and stamps were issued from that date inscribed Slovensko. Stamps of the former Czechoslovakia continued to be valid until 30 September 1993.

See also 
Postage stamps and postal history of Czechoslovakia
Postage stamps and postal history of the Czech Republic
Society for Czechoslovak Philately

References

Further reading 
 Bohemia, Moravia, Slovakia; a philatelic handbook. Brookfield, Illinois: Czechoslovak Philatelic Society of North America, 1958.

External links

 Czechoslovak Philatelic Society of Great Britain
 Stamp Domain Czech pages

History of Slovakia by topic
Postal system of Slovakia
Slovakia